Nargiza Abdurasulova is an Uzbekistani international footballer.

See also
List of Uzbekistan women's international footballers

External links 
 

Year of birth missing (living people)
Living people
Women's association football forwards
Uzbekistani women's footballers
Uzbekistan women's international footballers
21st-century Uzbekistani women